Channel 38 refers to several television stations:

Canada
The following television stations broadcast on digital or analog channel 38 (UHF frequencies covering 615.25-619.75 MHz) in Canada:
 CHCH-TV-5 in Sault Ste. Marie, Ontario
 CHNB-TV-11 in Woodstock, New Brunswick
 CIMT-DT-5 in Saint-Urbain, Quebec
 CJCO-DT in Calgary, Alberta

The following television stations operate on virtual channel 38 in Canada:
 CJCO-DT in Calgary, Alberta

Mexico
The following television stations operate on virtual channel 38 in Mexico:
 XHMEE-TDT in Mexicali, Baja California

See also
 Channel 38 TV stations in Mexico
 Channel 38 digital TV stations in the United States
 Channel 38 virtual TV stations in the United States
 Channel 38 low-power TV stations in the United States

38